Bram Stoker's Legend of the Mummy, or simply Bram Stoker's The Mummy, is a 1998 American fantasy horror film based on Bram Stoker's 1903 novel The Jewel of Seven Stars. Directed by Jeffrey Obrow, it features an ensemble cast that includes Louis Gossett Jr., Eric Lutes, Amy Locane, Lloyd Bochner, Victoria Tennant, Mary Jo Catlett, Aubrey Morris, and Richard Karn. Morris previously appeared in Blood from the Mummy's Tomb, a 1971 Hammer Films adaptation of the same novel.

Plot
Art historian Robert Wyatt is summoned to the house of his old flame, Margaret Trelawny. Her father, noted Egyptologist Abel Trelawny, was found in a coma in his study with claw marks on his wrist.  Per his dictated wishes, Trelawny asks that he be kept in the room with his Egyptian artifacts with two witnesses at all times.  Hoping to solve the mystery of Trelawny's case, Wyatt contacts Corbeck, an archaeologist who worked with Trelawny in the 1970s in uncovering the tomb of an Egyptian queen.

Cast
 Louis Gossett Jr. as Corbeck
 Amy Locane as Margaret Trelawny
 Eric Lutes as Robert Wyatt
 Mark Lindsay Chapman as Daw
 Lloyd Bochner as Abel Trelawny
 Mary Jo Catlett as Mrs. Grant
 Aubrey Morris as Doctor Winchester
 Laura Otis as Lily
 Julian Stone as Jimmy
 Richard Karn as Brice Renard
 Portia Doubleday as Young Margaret
 Rachel Naples as Queen Tera
 Donald Monet as Hutchins
 Kelly Perine as Keene
 Victoria Tennant as Mary

Production
Bram Stoker's The Mummy is the fourth film adaptation of the 1903 novel The Jewel of Seven Stars by Bram Stoker, following the 1970 television play The Curse of the Mummy (an installment of the TV series Mystery and Imagination), the 1971 Hammer Films production Blood from the Mummy's Tomb, and the 1980 film The Awakening.

Special effects
Effects artists Chad Washam and Chris Fording provided the special effects makeup for the film, which included a mummy prop built using a sculpted head, rubber hands, and a spandex suit with cloth bandages glued to it; mechanical seven-fingered hands; shriveled face makeup; a baby mummy suit; and a foam latex chest appliance for a death scene. The effects crew also utilized "lots of dirt", with Washam noting, "This whole movie is dirty. We must have used over 100 pounds of the stuff."

Release

The film was released direct-to-video in 1998 by A-Pix Entertainment on VHS and by Simitar Entertainment on DVD.

Reception

TV Guide gave the film a score of two out of five stars, writing that it "unearths a story familiar from classic Universal and Hammer horror movies; unfortunately, this straight-to-video rendition of the tale has few chills, and pales in comparison to the originals." Alan Jones of the Radio Times also awarded the film two out of five stars, and wrote that it "features the least believable Mummy make-up in horror history".

References

Bibliography

External links

 
 
 
 

1998 films
1998 fantasy films
1998 horror films
American fantasy films
American supernatural horror films
American direct-to-video films
Direct-to-video horror films
Films based on Irish novels
Films based on horror novels
Films based on works by Bram Stoker
Mummy films
1990s English-language films
Films directed by Jeffrey Obrow
1990s American films